The city of Oakland, California, was founded in 1852, and was incorporated in 1854.

Until the early 20th century, all Oakland mayors served terms of only one or two years each.

Terms
 Office terms:
 1 year 1854 – mayor elected by fellow city council members
 2 years 1893 – mayor elected by fellow city council members
 4 years 1953 – mayor elected by popular vote

List of mayors

See also
 Timeline of Oakland, California

References

Sources
 
 Includes photos
 
 List of mayors, Oakland Public Library
 Biographical Directory of the United States Congress

Oakland
 
Mayors